Lake Henry, is a natural lake in Kingsbury County, South Dakota, in the United States, near the town of De Smet. It has the name of George Henry, an early settler. Nowadays it is a popular fishing area.

In the media
Lake Henry is near De Smet, one of the residences of author Laura Ingalls Wilder (Little House on the Prairie books) and appears in several of her novels as one of the "Twin Lakes", along with Lake Thompson.

See also
List of lakes in South Dakota

References

Lakes of South Dakota
Lakes of Kingsbury County, South Dakota